Sham Wat is a village of Lantau Island, in Hong Kong.

Administration
Sham Wat is a recognized village under the New Territories Small House Policy.

References

Villages in Islands District, Hong Kong
Lantau Island